The Singapore-Cambridge General Certificate of Education Advanced Level (or Singapore-Cambridge GCE A-Level) is a GCE Advanced Level examination held annually in Singapore and is jointly conducted by the Ministry of Education (MOE), Singapore Examinations and Assessment Board (SEAB) and the University of Cambridge Local Examinations Syndicate (UCLES).

The examination is taken by school candidates upon the completion of their pre-university education at junior colleges and centralised institutes, and is also open to private candidates. The Singapore-Cambridge GCE Advanced Level examination has been de-linked from the British A-Level examinations since 2002, when the MOE took over the management of its national examination, due to differences in the development of the respective education systems in the two countries.

The Singapore-Cambridge GCE A-Level is recognised internationally by universities as a university entrance examination and employers as a tertiary education certificate.

The standards and grading for the subjects are determined by SEAB and MOE in consultation with the Cambridge International Examinations (CIE), a subsidiary of UCLES. Localised subjects, including Mother Tongue subjects such as Chinese, Malay and Tamil are marked locally.

Curriculum
In 2006, the Singapore's A-Level curriculum was revised for an enhanced curriculum framework dedicated to Singapore's education requirement. This is compared to the initial system of ‘AO’, ‘A’ and ‘S’ papers modelled after the United Kingdom education system. It was designed to emphasise multi-disciplinary learning, breadth of learning as well as flexibility, and it aims to prepare students well for the approaches being taken in university education, and for the demands of an innovation-driven world of the 21st century. The Singapore's A-Level differ in exam structure and subject content from GCE A-Level in other country such as the United Kingdom.

Under the new curriculum, candidates select subjects from three levels of study, namely Higher 1 (H1), Higher 2 (H2) and Higher 3 (H3). Subjects are divided into knowledge skills and content-based subjects. Knowledge skills subjects include General Paper, Knowledge and Inquiry and Project Work; content-based subjects are divided into languages, humanities and the arts, and mathematics and sciences. These changes took effect beginning with the batch taking the A Levels in 2007.

General Paper and Knowledge & Inquiry
General Paper (or GP) at H1 level or Knowledge & Inquiry (or KI) at H2 level are academic subjects offered at the Singapore-Cambridge GCE Advanced Level examination in the Singapore education system. All pre-university students in Singapore undertaking the Singapore-Cambridge GCE Advanced Level examination are required to offer either of the subjects.

General Paper aims to develop in students the ability to think critically, to construct cogent arguments and to communicate their ideas using clear, accurate and effective language. In addition, General Paper encourages students to explore a range of key issues of global and local significance and provides students with a good foundation to thrive in a fast-changing world.

The General Paper comprises two papers, Paper 1 and Paper 2, which carry 50 marks each and have equal weightage. 

Paper 1 comprises twelve questions that cover a wide range of topics, including but not limited to: history, society, culture, economy, politics, philosophy, sciences, mathematics, geography, literature and language, as well as topics of local interest and global concern. Candidates are to answer any one question out of the twelve given within a time span of 90 minutes. Candidates are to write an essay of length between 500 and 800 words. Marks are also allocated for the candidate's use of language throughout this paper; the maximum which may be awarded is twenty. 

Paper 2 comprises one or two passages of continuous prose. Candidates are required to demonstrate their ability to comprehend, explain, infer, evaluate and summarise within a time-span of 90 minutes. The sections tested include short answer questions, summary and an application question. Short answer questions require students to explain sections of the text. Most of the time, candidates will be required to use their own words in their answers, and will not be credited if they copy words directly from the passage. This ensures the candidate actually understands what the passage is talking about (and is not blindly copying without understanding it), and is also a test of their English language skills and vocabulary. The summary requires candidates to briefly outline points mentioned by the author about a specified topic in a few specified paragraphs of the passage, in their own words and with no more than 120 words. The application question requires the candidate to evaluate the author's arguments and apply the author's suggestions to their own country. Marks are also allocated for the candidate's use of language throughout this paper; the maximum which may be awarded is fifteen.

In 2012, the Singapore General Paper syllabus was modified. The old syllabus which had the subject code 8806 was replaced by a new syllabus with a different examination format and a new subject code 8807. A key difference in the new syllabus is that examiners require candidates to present conviction, confidence and be convincing in their essays, departing from set-piece essays and memorising core content. 

In early 2023, it is announced by MOE that GP will be compulsory for all JC and MI (Millennia Institute) students, starting with the 2024 intake. KI will be continued to offer, but not as a substitute of GP.  In 2022 A-level exams, about 100 Singapore students took KI instead of GP.

Subject combination
Subjects at H1 level constitutes one academic unit, subjects at H2 level constitutes two academic units, with the exception of subjects taken at H3 level. Students are invariably required to sit for either H1 General Paper or H2 Knowledge and Inquiry, and may opt to elect any combination and number of H1 and H2 subjects, up to a maximum of twelve academic units (AUs). A maximum of two H3 subjects can be applied. Subject examination of the H3 level subjects were previously offered as "Special papers" (or "S-Papers") under the Cambridge GCE Advanced Level before 2006.

Under the Ministry of Education's regulations, students sitting for the A-Level in a junior college are required to take at least one subject that is from a contrasting discipline. They are also required to fulfil additional academic requirements of Singapore's education system, such as having to take Project Work and a Mother Tongue Language.

Grading system
H1 and H2 subjects are graded alphabetically in the following manner.

Notes:
Candidates who pass at least one subject at H1 or H2 level will receive a Singapore-Cambridge General Certificate of Education (Advanced Level).
Grade 'S' denotes a sub-pass.
Grades 'S' and 'Ungraded' indicate that the candidate has failed to obtain a pass in the particular subject. These two grades do not appear on the certificate but will be shown on the result slip.
Subject(s) taken by the candidate under special arrangements will be annotated in the certificate.
H3 subjects are graded as either Distinction, Merit, Pass or Ungraded.

University Admission Score (UAS)
University Admission Score (UAS) is used in Singapore locally to determine where the student goes to university, especially which college and course to be enrolled in. To calculate the UAS, students first need to convert their A-level grades to rank points accordingly, and the UAS is the sum of all rank points. The maximum UAS currently is 90 points. 

However, it will be decreased to 70 points in 2026, after Project Work (PW) and the fourth content-based subject (H1 or H2) will not be counted in UAS calculation.

Candidate Performance 
In 2010, the number of school candidates who sat for the examination was 14,280, out of which 90.8% of them scored at least three Higher 2 (H2) passes, with a pass in General Paper (GP) or Knowledge and Inquiry (KI).

See also
 Education in Singapore
 General Certificate of Education
 GCE Advanced Level
 GCE Ordinary Level in Singapore
 Singapore-Cambridge GCE Normal Level
 Junior college (Singapore)
 Millennia Institute
 Centralised institutes (Singapore)

External links
 Singapore-Cambridge GCE A-Level on the SEAB website
 Press release: Results of the 2010 Singapore-Cambridge GCE Advanced Level

References

Education in Singapore